No-Do is the colloquial name for Noticiario y Documentales, ("News and Documentaries"), a state-controlled series of cinema newsreels produced in Spain from 1943 to 1981 and closely associated with the 1939–1975 Francisco Franco's dictatorial regime.

In their heyday, the No-Do newsreels predictably contained a good deal of propaganda and effervescent reporting in favour of the Francoist State. They were a way in which Franco could have a monopoly over the news and supply public information, censorship and propaganda for the formation of public opinion favorable to the Spanish State.

The No-Do newsreels, tainted by their indelible association with the Francoist State, fell out of favour within a few years of Spain's transition to democratic government after Franco's death. The last No-Do was produced in 1981 prior to the operation's absorption into RTVE, Spain's state-controlled television and radio broadcaster.
The No-Do archive is an important asset of RTVE and is often mined for nostalgia programmes.

In December 2012, the interactive media of RTVE digitized and launched the complete No-Do on the RTVE website, being able to be accessed for the first time by users around the world and not only by researchers. There are only five lost news.

References

External links
 

RTVE
Film series introduced in 1943
1943 establishments in Spain
1981 disestablishments in Spain
Film organisations in Spain
Francoist Spain
Newsreels
Propaganda film units
State-owned film companies
Spanish documentary films